La John Ngan Hsai (also spelt Lajawn Ngan Seng) was the Chief Minister of Kachin State, Myanmar from 2011 to 2016. He is an ethnic Kachin businessman.

A member of the Union Solidarity and Development Party, he was elected to represent Tanai Township Constituency No. 1 as a Kachin State Hluttaw representative in the 2010 Burmese general election.

References

Government ministers of Myanmar
People from Kachin State
Burmese businesspeople
Union Solidarity and Development Party politicians
Living people
Burmese people of Kachin descent
Year of birth missing (living people)